Series 39 of University Challenge began on 6 July 2009 and aired on BBC Two. Below is a list of the matches played with their scores and outcomes.

Schedule
The series comprised 37 matches over five rounds, airing between July 2009 and April 2010.

Format
The format of the show changed for the first time in many years. The quarter-finals were not a straight knock-out competition but involved a variant on the Swiss pairs format. Each of the eight teams that reached the quarter-final stage played two matches. Any team who won both of these matches progressed immediately to the semi-final; any team losing both were eliminated from the competition. The four remaining teams engaged in an additional play-off round for the other two semi-final places.

Results
 Winning teams are highlighted in bold.
 Teams with green scores (winners) returned in the next round, while those with red scores (losers) were eliminated.
 Orange scores indicate a further match must be played and won (highest scoring first round losers, teams that won their first quarter final match, teams that won their second quarter final match having lost their first, or teams that won their first quarter final match and lost their second).
 Yellow scores indicate that two further matches must be played and won (teams that lost their first quarter final match).
 A score in italics indicates a match decided on a tie-breaker question.

First round

Highest Scoring Losers play-offs

Second round

Quarter-finals

Semi-finals

Final

 The trophy and title were awarded to the Emmanuel team comprising Alexander Guttenplan, Andy Hastings, Jenny Harris and Josh Scott.
 The trophy was presented by Carol Ann Duffy.

References

External links
 Blanchflower Results Table

2010
2009 British television seasons
2010 British television seasons